The many-vertebrae snake eel (Echelus polyspondylus) is a species of ray-finned fish native to the Northwest Pacific.

Description
The species measures . It has many small cone-like teeth which marginally points backwards.  It has a long body with the tail making up the majority of the body length (65 to 69%). The very end of the tail is stretchable and the pectoral fin is sharp. The dorsal area is yellowish-brown, the undersides are lightly colored, and the anal-fin which is black is covered around pale areas of either fin.

References 

Ophichthidae